Jan Andersen (born 17 June 1945) is a Danish former professional footballer who played as a midfielder. He made eight appearances for the Denmark national team from 1969 to 1970.

References

External links
 

1945 births
Living people
Footballers from Copenhagen
Danish men's footballers
Association football midfielders
Denmark international footballers
Swiss Super League players
Boldklubben 1903 players
FC Fribourg players
BSC Young Boys players
Ballerup-Skovlunde Fodbold players
Danish expatriate men's footballers
Danish expatriate sportspeople in Switzerland
Expatriate footballers in Switzerland